Tessaropa is a genus of beetles in the family Cerambycidae, containing the following species:

 Tessaropa boliviana Martins & Galileo, 2006
 Tessaropa carioca Martins, 1981
 Tessaropa elongata Galileo & Martins, 2009
 Tessaropa guanabarina Martins, 1981
 Tessaropa hispaniolae Lingafelter, 2010
 Tessaropa luctuosa Zayas, 1975
 Tessaropa mineira Martins, 1981
 Tessaropa tenuipes (Haldeman, 1846)

References

Xystrocerini